Bill Bowman is a retired NASCAR Grand National Series driver from Aberdeen, Maryland. He raced from 1955 to 1957.

Bowman managed to get four "top ten finishes" after racing for 1,673 laps and earning $1,220 ($ when adjusted for inflation). His average start is 24th and his average finish is 15th place.

Dirt tracks were his favorite racing venue as Bowman managed to finish an average of 11th place. Intermediate tracks were his downfall; giving him difficulties as he finished an average of 35th place there. Darlington Raceway gave Bowman the most grief with an average finish of 35th place while he found pleasure in Forsyth County Fairgrounds and Langhorne Speedway giving him average finishes of 8th place.

Mostly associated with the #71 Chevrolet, Bill Bowman was an independent driver for most of his career.

References

External links
 

NASCAR drivers
People from Maryland